Mascarenhasia is a genus of plant in family Apocynaceae first described as a genus in 1844. It is native to  Africa and a few islands in the Indian Ocean. Several species are endemic to Madagascar.

Species
 Mascarenhasia arborescens A.DC. - Kenya, Tanzania, Zaire, Malawi, Mozambique, Zimbabwe, Comoros, Madagascar; naturalized in Seychelles 
 Mascarenhasia havetii A.DC. - Madagascar
 Mascarenhasia lanceolata A.DC.  - Madagascar
 Mascarenhasia lisianthiflora A.DC. - Madagascar
 Mascarenhasia macrosiphon Baker - Madagascar
 Mascarenhasia rubra Jum. & H.Perrier - Madagascar
 Mascarenhasia speciosa Scott-Elliot - Madagascar
 Mascarenhasia tampinensis Pichon - Madagascar

References

Apocynaceae genera
Flora of Africa
Malouetieae